Brewster House may refer to:

in the United States
(by state)
 Brewster House (Galt, California), listed on the NRHP in California
Brewster-Dutra House, in Paso Robles, CA, listed on the NRHP in California
Brewster Homestead Griswold, CT, listed on the NRHP in Connecticut
Royal Brewster House in Buxton, ME, listed on the NRHP in Maine
Brewster House (East Setauket, New York), listed on the NRHP in New York
Oliver Brewster House, in Cornwall, NY, listed on the NRHP in New York
Walter Brewster House in Brewster, NY, listed on the NRHP in New York
Jonathan Child House & Brewster-Burke House Historic District, Rochester, NY, listed on the NRHP in New York
Angell-Brewster House, Lebanon, OR, listed on the NRHP in Oregon